Robert Carmichael Mitchell (16 August 1924 – 8 April 1993) was a Scottish footballer. His position was outside left.

Mitchell started his career with Third Lanark in 1942, spending seven years with the Hi-Hi before joining Newcastle United for £16,000 in February 1949. He played for the Magpies from 1949 to 1961, becoming something of a cult hero amongst supporters who nicknamed him 'Dazzler'. He was an instrumental part of the team that experienced much success in the 1950s, winning three FA Cups in a five-year period, which included scoring a goal in the 1955 FA Cup Final. He made a total of 410 appearances for the club, scoring 113 goals.

After leaving Newcastle, Mitchell spent one season with Berwick Rangers before returning to Tyneside as player-manager of Gateshead. He left this role in 1966 and became a publican in Newcastle.

Mitchell won two caps for the Scotland national team, and scored on his debut against Denmark in 1951. He also played twice for the Scottish League representative team.

Honours

Newcastle United
 FA Cup winner: 1951, 1952, 1955

References

External links

Bobby Mitchell Profile on toon1892

1924 births
1993 deaths
Association football wingers
Berwick Rangers F.C. players
Gateshead A.F.C. managers
Gateshead A.F.C. players
Newcastle United F.C. players
Scotland international footballers
Scottish Football League players
Scottish Football League representative players
Scottish football managers
Scottish footballers
Footballers from Glasgow
English Football League players
Third Lanark A.C. players
British publicans
Scottish league football top scorers
FA Cup Final players
20th-century British businesspeople